Daniel "Dani" Pinillos González (born 22 October 1992) is a Spanish professional footballer who plays as a left-back for Rayo Majadahonda.

Club career

Early career
Born in Logroño, La Rioja, Pinillos graduated from local UD Logroñés' youth system, and joined Racing de Santander in July 2010. He made his senior debuts with the latter's B-team in the 2010–11 season, being relegated from Segunda División B.

On 9 July 2013, Pinillos signed for CD Ourense, also in the third level. He appeared regularly for the side, contributing with 21 appearances.

Córdoba
On 30 January 2014, Pinillos moved to fellow league club Córdoba CF B, and played his first official game with the main squad on 2 March, starting in a 1–0 away win against Girona FC in the Segunda División championship. On 18 July, after appearing in 16 matches during the campaign, he renewed his link with the Andalusians for three years, being definitely promoted to the first team now in La Liga.

Pinillos made his debut in the main category of Spanish football on 25 August 2014, starting and being booked in a 0–2 loss at Real Madrid. On 22 March of the following year, he was sent off in the dying minutes of a 1–3 away loss against Real Sociedad after offending the assistant referee, being later handed a four-match ban. On 11 June, after suffering relegation, Pinillos was released by the Verdiblancos.

Nottingham Forest
In July 2015, Pinillos went on a trial at English Football League Championship club Nottingham Forest, and agreed to a two-year contract with the club on 30 July. He made his Forest debut on 22 August in a 1–1 draw at Bolton Wanderers, and quickly established himself as the club's first-choice left-back. On Saturday 19 December, Pinillos ruptured his anterior cruciate knee ligaments in Forest's 2–1 win over MK Dons and missed the rest of the season through injury.

Pinillos finally made his first-team return for Forest on 19 November 2016, starting at left wing-back as his club defeated Ipswich Town 2–0 at Portman Road. Before Forest played their next match, however, the club disclosed that Pinillos required surgery on his other knee due to a meniscus injury that was expected to sideline him for "several weeks".

On 18 March 2017, Pinillos scored his first goal for the club, netting a last-minute headed equaliser against fierce rivals Derby County from a Ben Osborn corner, levelling the match at 2–2. Pinillos had also assisted Forest's first goal that day, with an outstanding cross for the on-rushing Zach Clough to tap in. On 15 May 2017, Forest manager Mark Warburton confirmed that Pinillos would leave the club at the end of his contract on 30 June.

Córdoba return
On 2 July 2017, Pinillos returned to his previous club Córdoba, after agreeing to a three-year deal. He immediately became a first-team regular for the side, featuring ahead of fellow new signing Javi Noblejas.

Barnsley
On 19 January 2018, Pinillos signed for Barnsley on a -year contract.

Miedź Legnica
On 29 September 2020, he joined Polish club Miedź Legnica on a one-year contract with an extension option. He played 23 Second Division matches in 12 months at the club.

UD Logroñés
On 30 August 2021 he signed for newly-relegated Third Division side UD Logroñés.

Career statistics

Honours

Club
Barnsley
EFL League One runner-up: 2018–19

References

External links

1992 births
Living people
Sportspeople from Logroño
Spanish footballers
Footballers from La Rioja (Spain)
Association football defenders
La Liga players
Segunda División players
Segunda División B players
Tercera División players
I liga players
UD Logroñés players
Rayo Cantabria players
CD Ourense footballers
Córdoba CF B players
Córdoba CF players
Nottingham Forest F.C. players
Barnsley F.C. players
Miedź Legnica players
CF Rayo Majadahonda players
Spanish expatriate footballers
Spanish expatriate sportspeople in England
Expatriate footballers in England
Expatriate footballers in Poland